Peter F. Kilmartin (born 1962) was the 73rd Attorney General of Rhode Island. Kilmartin is also a retired police captain and a former member of the Rhode Island House of Representatives.

Biography
Kilmartin was born February 18, 1962, in Rhode Island. Kilmartin attended William E. Tolman High School in Pawtucket and graduated in 1980. Kilmartin was sworn in as a police officer with the Pawtucket Police Department in June 1984 while continuing his studies at Roger Williams University, where he earned his Bachelor of Science in 1988. He later returned to school, and earned his Juris Doctor in 1998 from Roger Williams University School of Law. Kilmartin eventually rose through the ranks of the Pawtucket Police Department, ultimately attaining the rank of captain of the department's prosecution division. He retired from the police department in 2008, after 24 years of service.

Politics and public service
Peter Kilmartin was first elected as a state representative on November 6, 1990, into the 80th district. Upon downsizing of the House of Representatives from 100 to 75 members in the 2002 election, Kilmartin ran unopposed and was elected to serve in the 61st district. Running unopposed, Kilmartin was most recently re-elected on 4 November 2008. He served as Majority Whip from 2005 to 2010, and during the 2009-2010 legislative session, Kilmartin served on the House Committee on Corporations, House Committee on Labor, House Committee on Rules, and the Joint Committee on Highway Safety .

Kilmartin announced he would not seek an eleventh term in the House of Representatives at the end of the 2010 session, and on February 23, 2010, he announced his intention to run for the office of Attorney General of Rhode Island. He was elected as Rhode Island's Attorney General on November 2, 2010.

Electoral history

Notes

External links
Legislative homepage
  Vote Smart Biography
Campaign website

|-

|-

|-

1962 births
21st-century American politicians
American municipal police officers
Living people
Democratic Party members of the Rhode Island House of Representatives
Politicians from Pawtucket, Rhode Island
People from Providence County, Rhode Island
Rhode Island Attorneys General
Rhode Island lawyers
Roger Williams University alumni
Roger Williams University School of Law alumni